The Nemeturii (Gaulish *Nemeturioi, 'the inhabitants of nemetons') or Nemeturi were a Gallic tribe dwelling in the Alpes Maritimae during the Iron Age.

Name 

They are mentioned as Nemeturicae by Columella (1st c. AD), and as Nemoturica and Nematuri (var. nemet-) by Pliny (1st c. AD).

The ethnic name Nemeturii is a latinized form of Gaulish *Nemeturioi. It derives from the stem nemeto-, meaning 'sacred place, sanctuary', and can be translated as 'the inhabitants of sacred places'.

Geography 
The Nemeturii dwelled in the upper Verdon or Var valley. Their territory was located east of the Eguiturii, west of the Ecdinii, north of the Vergunni and Nerusii, and south of the Savincates and Caturiges.

History 
They are mentioned by Pliny the Elder as one of the Alpine tribes conquered by Rome in 16–15 BC, and whose name was engraved on the Tropaeum Alpium.

References

Primary sources

Bibliography 

Historical Celtic peoples
Gauls
Tribes of pre-Roman Gaul